The Christian Council of Sweden is an ecumenical Christian organization in Sweden, established on 15 December 1992.

Member denominations
Following denominations were members in 2013:

Free church movement
Evangelical Free Church
Uniting Church in Sweden
Salvation Army
Swedish Pentecostal Movement
Swedish Alliance Mission
Vineyard Norden

Lutheran
Estonian Evangelical Lutheran Church
Latvian Evangelical Lutheran Church
Church of Sweden including the Swedish Evangelical Mission
Hungarian Protestant Church

Eastern Orthodox
Bulgarian Orthodox Church
Finnish Orthodox Church
Macedonian Orthodox Church
Romanian Orthodox Church
Russian Orthodox Church (Parish of the Transfiguration of Jesus)
Russian Orthodox Church (Moscow Patriarcate)
Serbiska ortodoxa kyrkan
Saint Selasse Ethipic Orthodox Church

Oriental Orthodox
Armenian Apostolic Church
Ethiopian Orthodox Church
Coptic Orthodox Church
Syriac Orthodox Archdiocese of Sweden and the Rest of Scandinavia

Church of the East
Assyrian Church of the East
Old Church of the East

Roman Catholic
Roman Catholic Diocese of Stockholm

Observing members
Seventh-day Adventist Church

Earlier members
 Estonian Orthodox Church
 French Orthodox Church
 Free Baptist Union, became part of the Sanctification Union/Free Baptist Union and later the Evangelical Free Church in Sweden
 Sanctification Union, became part of the Sanctification Union/Free Baptist Union and later the Evangelical Free Church in Sweden
 United Methodist Church of Sweden, became part of the Uniting Church in Sweden
 Swedish Baptism Union, became part of the Uniting Church in Sweden
 Mission Covenant Church of Sweden, became part of the Uniting Church in Sweden
 Örebro Mission, became part of the Evangelical Free Church in Sweden

References

External links
Christian Council of Sweden 

Sweden
1992 establishments in Sweden
History of Christianity in Sweden
Religious organizations based in Sweden
Christian organizations established in 1992